Calytrix achaeta, commonly known as the white-flowered turkey bush, kerosene wood or fringe-myrtle, is a species of plant in the myrtle family Myrtaceae that is native to Western Australia and the Northern Territory.

It blooms between January and August producing white flowers forming seeds after the plant is about 10 years of age. It has a lifespan of 11 to 20 years and forms a lignotuber from which it is able to resprout from following a fire.

Often found on flats or hills in the Kimberley region of Western Australia and the Top End of the Northern Territory where it grows in sandy soils over laterite, quartzite or granite.

The Kunwinjku peoples know the plant as mandjumbak and the Kundjeyhmi know it as andjumbak. Indigenous Australians used the wood from the plant to make fish hooks, spearthrower pegs and for firewood.

The species was originally described as Lhotzkya cuspidata by the botanist Ferdinand von Mueller in 1856 in the work North Australian Botany. published in Hooker's Journal of Botany and Kew Garden Miscellany then as  Calycothrix achaeta in 1859 in  Diagnostic notes on new or imperfectly known Australian plants. published in the Transactions of the Philosophical Institute of Victoria. It was subsequently reclassified as Calythrix achaeta by Bentham then Calythrix cuspidata by Druce and finally as Calytrix achaeta by George Bentham in 1867 in Orders XLVIII. Myrtaceae- LXII. Compositae. as part of the work Flora Australiensis.

References

Plants described in 1867
achaeta
Flora of Western Australia
Flora of the Northern Territory
Taxa named by Ferdinand von Mueller